John Wiseman is an author.

John Wiseman may also refer to:

Johnny Wiseman (1916–2005), British soldier
John Wiseman (MP) (by 1515–1558), for East Grinstead and Maldon
Sir John Wiseman, see Wiseman baronets

See also
Jack Wiseman (?–2009), chairman of Birmingham City Football Club
Jack Wiseman (economist) (1919–1991), British economist